Bismayah is a city about  southeast of Baghdad.  It is a part of the Baghdad Governorate.

History
Bismayah is the first and the largest city development project of the past decade in Iraq. Bismayah is located 10 km southeast of Baghdad on the main highway connecting Baghdad-Kut, spread over a total area of 1,830 hectares, and is being built to accommodate around 600,000 occupants in a total of 100,000 residential units. Bismayah was planned by the Baghdad Investment Commission to build 100,000 homes and later joined by external investors in efforts to help rebuild Iraq. 

The new city will be constructed according to the latest international standards with full services including schools, clinics, and commercial, social and entertainment centers. Moreover, a modern road network is being built specifically for the project, linking it to the highway and thus connecting it to the Iraqi capital.

The city is a planned community aimed to support lower-middle class residents.

The government of Iraq will develop the public facilities such as education, religious, welfare, and commercial facilities as well as infrastructure such as water, electricity and sewage treatment plants. According to its developers, Bismayah is intended to fill the lives of 600,000 citizens of Baghdad with happiness and be the most outstanding world class city beyond Iraq and Middle East as the first project of the National Housing Program.

On 30 January 2018, ISIL affixed a bomb to a car in the city, killing one member of the Popular Mobilization Forces.

Design 
The residential areas are situated around Bismayah centre, which will contain numerous office buildings, markets, mosques, and venues. A green space is situated between the residential area and the centre. 

The residential buildings have a similar appearance to plattenbau-style apartments, but are 'U'-shaped. Parking lots are situated inside the 'U'. Each residential building is 10 floors high and contains an elevator. A green space surrounds each residential building, with walkways connecting the buildings.

The residential area is in close proximity to various amenities such as youth and cultural centres, hospitals, police stations, firehouses, and schools.

Construction
The construction of Bismayah was started in early 2013 by Hanwha, a South Korean company. The city is expected to be completed between 2019 and 2021.

As of June 2015, the first block (A-1) out of the six blocks which make up district A that will accommodate approximately 25,000 citizens had been completed.

Neighbourhoods 
The city is to contain two sections. The first section is the city centre. The second section is the residential section, encompassing the residential areas.

The residential area is divided into districts labelled from A to H:

 District A consists of 14,280 residential units
District B consists of 15,240 residential units
District C consists of 10,200 residential units 
District D consists of 9,480 residential units 
District E consists of 13,920 residential units 
District F consists of 13,440 residential units
District G consists of 10.920 residential units
District H consists of 12,600 residential units

Each district contains blocks of residential areas, and each residential building is numbered after, for example District A-1 1. 

Services such as schools are assigned to each district.

Attractions 

 Bismayah Mall
 Bismayah Lookout Tower

Pictures

See also
 List of places in Iraq

References

External links 
 Bismayah New City project Official Website

Cities in Iraq
District capitals of Iraq
2013 establishments in Iraq